The Sukhoi Su-1 or I-330 was a prototype Soviet high-altitude fighter aircraft built at the beginning of World War II. An improved version, designated Su-3 (I-360), was also built and tested the following year. Neither version was mass-produced.

Development
In 1939, Sukhoi was tasked with designing a high-altitude fighter, the resulting Su-1 was a conventional monoplane with a streamlined wooden semi-monocoque fuselage, low-set all-metal wing made of duralumin and un-pressurized cockpit. The key feature of the aircraft was a pair of TK-2 turbochargers driven by exhaust gases from the Klimov M-105P engine. The prototype was completed at the Sukhoi plant in Kharkov in May 1940, flying for the first time, on 15 June 1940, with A.P. Chernyavsky at the controls. Testing continued until 3 August, when Chernavskii mistakenly landed with the landing gear retracted. After the completion of repairs in mid-September, testing resumed, but an in-flight engine failure on 2 October resulted in a dead-stick landing. Limited flight testing continued until April 1941, with the Su-1 reaching a top speed of 641 km/h (345 kn, 400 mph) at 10,000 m (32,810 ft). However, the turbochargers proved unreliable and without them the aircraft was inferior in performance to the Yakovlev Yak-1.

Su-3
The second Su-1 prototype, built as the Su-3, differed in having a revised wing section with wing area reduced to 17 m² (183 ft²). Completed in 1941, the Su-3 demonstrated better performance than the Su-1, but suffered from continuing problems with the TK-2 turbochargers. Further development was cancelled on 16 April 1941, when production of reliable TK-2 turbo-chargers was delayed.

The fate of the two prototype aircraft is uncertain. According to some reports, the Su-1 was destroyed during the bombing of a train near Novosibirsk, while the Su-3 was destroyed within the city of Novosibirsk during the Great Patriotic War.

Operators

Soviet Air Force

Specifications (Su-1)

See also

References

Su-01
1940s Soviet fighter aircraft
Abandoned military aircraft projects of the Soviet Union
Single-engined tractor aircraft
Low-wing aircraft
Aircraft first flown in 1940